Simone Biasci (born 6 April 1970 in Pontedera) is an Italian former professional cyclist.

Major results

1986
 1st Coppa d'Oro
1988
 1st  Junior National Road Race Championships
1990
 1st Gran Premio Industria e Commercio Artigianato Carnaghese
 1st Gara Ciclistica Montappone
 1st Targa Crocifisso
 3rd Giro del Casentino
1991
 1st Stage 2 Peace Race
 3rd Gran Premio della Liberazione
1992
 3rd Coppa Sabatini
 3rd Criterium d'Abruzzo
1994
 1st Stage 7 Vuelta a España
 1st Stages 2 & 3 Volta a Catalunya
1996
 1st Stage 2 Euskal Bizikleta
 1st Stage 6 Vuelta a Asturias
 2nd Overall Clásica Internacional de Alcobendas
1997
 1st Stage 4 Vuelta a Mexico
2003
 1st Stage 13 Vuelta a Cuba
2004
 3rd Overall Tour de Tunisie
1st Stage 9
2005
 1st Stage 13 Vuelta a Cuba
2006
 1st Stage 3 Vuelta a Cuba

Grand Tour general classification results timeline

References

1970 births
Living people
Italian male cyclists
Sportspeople from the Province of Pisa
People from Pontedera
Cyclists from Tuscany